Oh Happy Day is the seventeenth album by American singer/guitarist Glen Campbell, released in 1970 (see 1970 in music).

Track listing

Side 1:

 "Someone Above" (Andrew Sandersier, James L. Faragher) – 3:20
 "Oh Happy Day" (Edwin Hawkins) – 3:38
 "I Believe" (Ervin Drake, Irvin Graham, Jimmy Shirl, Al Stillman) – 2:47
 "He's Got the Whole World in His Hands" (Traditional, arranged by Marty Paich) – 2:33
 "You'll Never Walk Alone" (Richard Rodgers, Oscar Hammerstein II) – 2:49

Side 2:

 "One Pair of Hands" (Mike Curtis, Barbarita Campbell) – 2:28
 "He" (Jack Richards, Richard Mullan) – 2:52
 "People Get Ready" (Curtis Mayfield) – 1:58
 "Angels in the Sky" (Dick Glasser) – 2:45
 "Daddy Sang Bass" (Carl Perkins) – 2:12

Personnel
Glen Campbell – vocals, guitar
Hal Blaine – drums
Louis Shelton – acoustic guitar
Tibor Zelig – violin

Production
Producer – Al De Lory
Arranged by Al De Lory, Dennis McCarthy, Marty Paich
Engineers – Joe Polito, Pete Abbott
Photography – Ed Simpson/Capitol Photo Studio

Charts
Album – Billboard (United States)

Singles – Billboard (United States)

Glen Campbell albums
1970 albums
Capitol Records albums
Albums arranged by Marty Paich
Albums recorded at Capitol Studios